The Byrd–Hagel Resolution was a United States Senate Resolution passed unanimously with a vote of 95–0 on 25 July 1997, sponsored by Senators Chuck Hagel and Robert Byrd. The resolution stated that the US should not sign a climate treaty that would 'mandate new commitments to limit or reduce greenhouse gas emissions for the Annex I Parties, unless ...[it]... also mandates new specific scheduled commitments to limit or reduce greenhouse gas emissions for Developing Country Parties within the same compliance period', or would result in serious harm to the economy of the United States. This effectively prohibited the US from ratifying the Kyoto Protocol.

Impact 
Despite the unanimous passage of the Byrd–Hagel resolution, U.N. Ambassador Peter Burleigh signed the Kyoto Protocol on behalf of the Clinton Administration on November 12 1998. However the Clinton Administration ultimately withheld the treaty from acquiring Senate approval due to potential political backlash and disapproval.

At the outset of the Bush administration, Senators Chuck Hagel, Jesse Helms, Larry Craig, and Pat Roberts wrote a letter to President George W. Bush seeking to identify his stance on the Kyoto Protocol and climate change policy. In a letter dated March 13, 2001, President Bush responded "I oppose the Kyoto Protocol because it exempts 80 percent of the world, including major population centers such as China and India, from compliance, and would cause serious harm to the U.S. economy. The Senate's vote, 95-0, shows that there is a clear consensus that the Kyoto Protocol is an unfair and ineffective means of addressing global climate change concerns."

During the Obama administration, the U.S. pursued climate policies such as the Copenhagen Accord and Paris Agreement in advocating for more comprehensive environmental reform and to allow nations to self determine their own emission based commitments. In a 2015 Time article, former U.S. Secretary of Defense Chuck Hagel stated that "Congress should play an active role in the negotiations—not by blocking the deal, but by sending a new Global Climate Change Observer Group to report on the proceedings in Paris and closely evaluate other countries’ climate plans".

Related legislation 
H.Res.211 was a U.S. House of Representatives Resolution that was introduced with the support of 102 cosponsors on July 31, 1997. H.Res.211 maintained similar language to the Byrd–Hagel Resolution incurring that the Kyoto Protocol should "(1) mandate new commitments to limit or reduce greenhouse gas emissions for the Annex 1 Parties, unless the protocol or other agreement also mandates new specific scheduled commitments to limit or reduce greenhouse gas emissions for Developing Country Parties within the same compliance period; or (2) result in serious harm to the U.S. economy." Despite the initial popularity of the resolution it ultimately was referred to the Subcommittee on International Economic Policy and Trade where no subsequent action took place.

Notes

Climate change policy in the United States
1997 in the environment
Robert Byrd
105th United States Congress
United States federal energy legislation